Dennis Mangers (born October 13, 1940, in Inglewood, California) is an American Democratic politician from California.

Life 
Mangers was a member of the California State Assembly for the 73rd district from Orange County from 1974 to 1980.  He ultimately lost re-election to Nolan Frizzelle. After leaving elected office, Mangers worked as a lobbyist. 
Mangers is married to Michael Sestak and has two children.

External links 
 Calbarjournal:Former lawmaker Dennis Mangers named to board of governors
 Join California Dennis Mangers

References

Democratic Party members of the California State Assembly
Living people
People from Orange County, California
Place of birth missing (living people)
LGBT state legislators in California
1940 births
21st-century LGBT people